Rogojel may refer to several villages in Romania:

 Rogojel, a village in Săcuieu Commune, Cluj County
 Rogojel, a village in Fărcășești Commune, Gorj County